Mustansiriyah University is a university in Baghdad, Iraq.

History

The original Mustansiriya Madrasah was established in 1227 (or 1232/34 A.D. by some accounts) by the Abbasid Caliph Al-Mustansir and was one of the oldest universities in the world. Its building, on the left bank of the Tigris River, survived the Mongol invasion of 1258 and has been restored.

The modern Mustansiriyah University was established with the help and financial support of the Republic of Ίrāq Teacher's Union in 1963, mainly providing evening courses.  In 1964, the university was given the status of a semi-state institution and some state financial support.  At the same time it absorbed Al-Sha’ab University, another private university that had been founded by the Ίrāqi Association of Economists, and then moved to a new campus to the north of the city centre. Initially, the university also managed colleges in Mosul and Basra.

In 1966 a law was passed under which the private universities were converted into public universities.  Mustansiriyah thus became, briefly, a college within the University of Baghdad. In 1967 a major reorganisation of higher education was initiated, with the intention that by 1969 all previous institutions would be abolished and reconstituted.  Mustansiriyah was designated as a separate University in 1968, and its branch campuses were detached to form part of the University of Mosul and the University of Basra.

Colleges
 College of Medicine: Based outside the main campus, attached to Al-Yarmouk Teaching Hospital and national center of hematology . It is one of four medical schools in Baghdad and the second established (after the University of Baghdad medical college).
 College of Dentistry: The second in Baghdad (after the University of Baghdad dentistry college). Based outside the main campus, attached to Al-Karama Teaching Hospital.
 College of Law
 College of Management and Economy
 College of Arts
 College of Education
 College of Science
 College of Physical Education
 College of Engineering
 College of Pharmacy 
 College of Political Science
 College of Basic Education
 College of Hospitality
QA Department

Notable alumni
Kasim Muhammad Taqi al-Sahlani, a member of the Council of Representatives of Iraq
Rahim AlHaj, an oud player and composer
Nadhmi Auchi, a businessman and billionaire
Alia Mamdouh, a novelist, author and journalist
Betool Khedairi, novelist/author
Abdullatif Ahmad Mustafa, Kurdish Salafi cleric
Bashar M. Nema, Professor of Information security

External links

Official website 
Official website 
College of Medicine 
College of dentistry 
College of Pharmacy 

 
Mustansiriyah
Educational institutions established in the 13th century
Education in Baghdad
Arabic architecture
Abbasid architecture
1227 establishments in Asia
1963 establishments in Iraq